The Thomas's yellow-shouldered bat (Sturnira thomasi) is a species of bat in the family Phyllostomidae. It is endemic to Guadeloupe.

Taxonomy 
The genus Sturnira is known from six islands in the Lesser Antilles with Montserrat being the furthest north. The subspecies S. t. vulcanensis is known only from Montserrat having been first reported there in 1996. The subspecific name refers to the Soufrière that has seriously damaged natural habitat and the lives of the citizens of Montserrat with its recent eruptions.

Description 
The fur of this animal is uniformly grayish brown dorsally and ventrally and lacks the "yellow shoulder" characteristic of the genus.

Habitat and distribution 
The bat is extremely rare. It is relatively uncommon on many of the Antillean islands where it does occur and, unlike some fruit bats, it needs native humid forest rather than tropical agriculture to flourish. Only two examples have been mist-netted on Montserrat - one in 1994 in the Paradise Estate area and another in 2005 in Bottomless Ghaut.

References

Two new subspecies of bats of the genus Sturnira form the Lesser Antilles. Occasional Papers, Museum of Texas Tech University, Number 176, 1998. Hugh H. Genoways

Sturnira
Bats of the Caribbean
Endemic fauna of Guadeloupe
Mammals of Guadeloupe
Mammals described in 1966
Taxonomy articles created by Polbot